Josef Elting (born 29 December 1944) is a German former professional footballer who played as a goalkeeper for Schalke 04, 1. FC Kaiserslautern, Real Murcia, Wuppertaler SV and 1. FC Bocholt.

References

External links
 
 
 

1944 births
Living people
People from Bocholt, Germany
Sportspeople from Münster (region)
German footballers
Footballers from North Rhine-Westphalia
Association football goalkeepers
Bundesliga players
2. Bundesliga players
FC Schalke 04 players
1. FC Kaiserslautern players
Real Murcia players
Wuppertaler SV players
1. FC Bocholt players
La Liga players
Segunda División players
German expatriate footballers
German expatriate sportspeople in Spain
Expatriate footballers in Spain